The American Legion Hall is a historic social meeting hall at Race and Spruce Streets in the center of Searcy, Arkansas.  It is a single-story structure, built out of native fieldstone in 1939 with funding support from the Works Progress Administration (WPA).  Its main block has a side-facing gable roof, with a projecting flat-roof section in which the entrance is recessed under a rounded archway.  The building is typical of rustic-styled buildings constructed by the WPA and other jobs programs of the Great Depression.

The building was listed on the National Register of Historic Places in 1991.

See also
National Register of Historic Places listings in White County, Arkansas

References

Clubhouses on the National Register of Historic Places in Arkansas
Buildings and structures completed in 1939
American Legion buildings
National Register of Historic Places in Searcy, Arkansas
1939 establishments in Arkansas
Rustic architecture in Arkansas
Works Progress Administration in Arkansas